The Wind in the Willows is a 1908 children's book by Kenneth Grahame.

The Wind in the Willows may also refer to:

Adaptations of the book
The Wind in the Willows (1949 film), the first segment of the Disney animated package film The Adventures of Ichabod and Mr. Toad
The Wind in the Willows (1983 film), a British stop-motion animated film produced by Cosgrove Hall
The Wind in the Willows (TV series), a 1984–1990 British animated series by Cosgrove Hall
Wind in the Willows, a 1985 Broadway musical by William P. Perry
The Wind in the Willows (1987 film), an American animated film by Rankin/Bass
Wind in the Willows (1988 film), an animated television film from Burbank Films Australia
The Wind in the Willows (1995 film), a British animated television film directed by Dave Unwin
The Wind in the Willows (1996 film), a British live-action film by Terry Jones
The Wind in the Willows (2006 film), a British-Canadian live-action television film
The Wind in the Willows (musical), a 2016 British musical written by Julian Fellowes

Music
The Wind in the Willows (band), a folk rock band that included Debbie Harry
"Wind in the Willows", a song written by Alan Bell and performed by many artists, including Blackmore's Night from Under a Violet Moon
The Wind in the Willows, a composition by Johan de Meij